The JamMan is an audio looping device manufactured by Lexicon in the mid-1990s. The idea for the JamMan began with modifications Gary Hall had devised for the Lexicon PCM-42 that allowed him to play into a long, looping delay whose clock could be synchronized to an external source. (Hall, who worked for Lexicon in two different periods, was the primary architect of the PCM41 and PCM42, as well as the non-reverberation effects that first appeared in the 224X and became better known in the PCM70.) Bob Sellon extended the concept considerably, starting with elaborate PCM42 modifications and eventually working with several others at Lexicon to arrive at the JamMan.

The product allowed musicians to record musical phrases at the touch of a button which were then played back, looping indefinitely. The musician would typically use the looping audio as a backing track providing a virtual backing band.  The device also allowed MIDI drum machines and sequencers to be synchronized to them providing additional accompaniment.  By pressing a button on the floor pedal, the device begins recording a rhythm (8 seconds of memory comes standard, but an upgraded 32-second memory chip is a common upgrade). When the musician is finished playing the part to be looped, simply press the tap button on the floor again and the machine does two things immediately: replays the part from the beginning looping it indefinitely while sending a MIDI clock signal to a drum machine which kicks in right on time and is synchronized to the rhythm part. 

The JamMan is a 1U rack mounted unit that is controlled using 1 or 2 footswitches or via MIDI.

Users
Daft Punk
Peter Gabriel
Junior Vasquez
Joseph Arthur
Chet Atkins
David Torn
Alessandro Batazzi
Radio Chongqing
Blixa Bargeld
Boyd Rice
Nick Robinson
Keller Williams
Phil Keaggy
Tristan 'Z' Zand
Jacob Moon
Kelly Burnette
Matthieu Chedid
Michael Brecker
Keith Marquis

See also
 DigiTech JamMan

References

External links
 Looper's Delight Jam Man page with info and links

Effects units
Sound recording technology
Sound production technology
Sampling (music)